Philip Graham Harris (born 12 May 1990) is an English cricketer. Harris is a right-handed batsman who bowls right-arm medium pace. He was born at Worcester, Worcestershire.

Harris was educated at The Chase School, before studying for a degree in Sports Conditioning, Rehabilitation and Massage at the University of Wales Institute, Cardiff. While studying there, he made his debut in first-class cricket for Cardiff MCCU against Somerset at Taunton Vale Sports Club Ground. He made a second first-class appearance in that same season against Warwickshire at Edgbaston. He also made his minor counties debut for Herefordshire against Northumberland in the 2012 MCCA Knockout Trophy at The Park, Brockhampton. He is also a member of the Unicorns squad for the 2012 Clydesdale Bank 40.

References

External links
Phil Harris at ESPNcricinfo
Phil Harris at CricketArchive

1990 births
Living people
Sportspeople from Worcester, England
Alumni of Cardiff Metropolitan University
English cricketers
Cardiff MCCU cricketers
Herefordshire cricketers